Kunitsukami (国つ神,  国津神) are the kami of the land and live in tsuchi. 

They were contrasted from the Amatsukami, although modern Shinto no longer makes the distinction between Amatsukami and Kunitsukami. According to Yijiang Zhong the distinction was made by the writers of the Nihon Shoki and the Kojiki to formulate a political discourse.   

Kunitsukami were often presented as tutelary deities. They were also associated with geographical areas along with their inhabitants. Non-royal families also viewed them as their ancestors. They also were considered personifications of the land.  

Mythology 

Many myths in the Nihon Shoki and the Kojiki are about the conflict between the Kunitsukami and the Amatsukami.

List of kunitsukami 

 Okuninushi
Ashinazuchi
Tenazuchi
Ōyamatsumi
Sarutahiko

 Sovereign God
 Ōkuninushi
 Ōkuninushi no Gokojin
 Ajisukitakahikone, Shimo-shitsu-biki, Kotoshironushi, Takeminakata, Kizumata god, and Tora-kami god
 The gods who are the spouses of the lord of the great nation
 Suseri Vipassana, Yagami Vipassana, Numagawa Vipassana, Dokiri Vipassana, Kamiya Taten Vipassana, Tottorijin
 Others
 Ōyamatsumi, Susanoo-no-Mikoto, Kushinadahime, Sukunabikona, Ōmononushi, Kuebiko, Taka Kagyu,  Watatsumi, Ōyamatsumi, Ukanomitama, Toshigami, Konohanasakuya-hime, Tamayori-hime, Toyotama-hime, Moreya, Isetsuhiko,

See also 

 Heavenly and Earthly crimes
 Aesir and Vanir

References 

Shinto kami
Types of deities
Kunitsukami